Something Always Happens is a 1934 British romantic comedy film directed by Michael Powell and starring Ian Hunter and Nancy O'Neil. It was made as a Quota quickie.

Plot 
Peter Middleton is an unemployed car salesman. He rescues hungry street urchin Billy, who has been caught stealing from a street vendor, and takes him under his wing. Peter rents a room. He has no money, but Mrs. Badger, the landlady, is too kindhearted to turn the pair away.

When an acquaintance mentions that he has a client who wants to purchase a 1934 Bentley, Peter sees an opportunity to make a commission and scours the streets. He finds one and brazenly inspects it, much to the puzzlement of the chauffeur. In the process, Peter accidentally backs into Cynthia Hatch. When he pretends the car is his, she gets him to take her to a fine restaurant. She lets him believe she is also out of work, but in reality, she is the Bentley's owner. She is well known to the restaurant staff, but she asks the maitre d' to pretend to not know her to play a trick on Peter. Peter eventually confesses he has no money. She talks him into trying to see Mr. Hatch, the wealthy head of several petrol-related companies (and her father).

Peter spends all night devising a plan to make petrol stations more attractive to customers by offering additional services, such as dining, dancing and even swimming pools. Meanwhile, Cynthia asks her father to see Peter. The following day, Peter gets to meet Hatch, but Hatch turns him down without even giving Peter a chance to explain his plan. Hatch jokingly suggests he go see Blue Point, a rival which is being beaten down by his company. Peter does so, and is hired as their manager.

Peter makes Blue Point a great success, much to the chagrin of Hatch, who had been hoping to buy the struggling company. Peter hires Cynthia as his secretary, still unaware of her true identity. Within a year, Blue Point has overtaken and soared past Hatch's company. When Peter learns that a bypass is going to be built, he plans to buy sites for petrol stations along the route before Hatch hears about it. However, George Hamlin, Blue Point's publicist, has done such a poor job that Peter threatens to sack him; George betrays the plan to Hatch, who outbids Peter's company for all the sites. After Peter receives the bad news, he sees Cynthia taking money from Hatch and concludes that she betrayed him. When he confronts her, she denies it and storms out, but not before revealing that Hatch is her father. Afterward, Peter learns that the bypass will not be built for another fifteen years. Hatch offers to sell some of his holdings to Peter, those he believes the bypass will make worthless. Knowing otherwise, Peter accepts. After the sale, Hatch learns of the delay and realises he has been outwitted. However, he is not too displeased, having come to respect Peter. When Peter runs into George outside Hatch's office, he realises who the real traitor is. Peter then reconciles with Cynthia, much to her father's secret delight.

Cast 
 Ian Hunter as Peter Middleton
 Nancy O'Neil as Cynthia Hatch
 Peter Gawthorne as Ben Hatch
 John Singer as Billy
 Muriel George as Mrs. Badger
 Barry Livesey as George Hamlin

External links 

Something Always Happens reviews and articles at the Powell & Pressburger Pages

1934 films
British romantic comedy films
Films directed by Michael Powell
Films by Powell and Pressburger
Films about businesspeople
Quota quickies
British black-and-white films
1934 romantic comedy films
1930s English-language films
1930s British films